Gardiner's Sign List is a list of common Egyptian hieroglyphs compiled by Sir Alan Gardiner. It is considered a standard reference in the study of ancient Egyptian hieroglyphs.

Gardiner lists only the common forms of Egyptian hieroglyphs, but he includes extensive subcategories, and also both vertical and horizontal forms for many hieroglyphs.  He includes size-variation forms to aid with the reading of hieroglyphs in running blocks of text.  In contrast, for example, the Budge Reference has about 1,000 hieroglyphs listed in 50 pages, but with no size variations.

Gardiner does not cross-index signs; once put on the list, other significant uses may be overlooked. One example of this is G16, nbtỉ, the ideogram for the Two Ladies, goddesses Wadjet as the cobra and Nekhbet as the white vulture. These are the protective and patron goddesses of the separate Egyptian kingdoms that joined into ancient Egypt, who were both then displayed on the uraeus of Wadjet when the unification occurred and afterward considered jointly to be the protectors of Egypt and the pharaohs. This ideogram is listed only in the bird list (G), and overlooked on the deity list (C) and the reptile list (I).

Other subcategories included by Gardiner are abbreviations and personalized forms, and also a complete subset, used on papyrus, specifically for the Book of the Dead.

Categories

A. Man and his occupations 

56 signs in Gardiner (1957:242–247), with  A59 "man threatening with  stick" inserted after A25 "man striking with left hand hanging behind back", and two variants A14* "blood interpreted as ax" of A14 "man with blood streaming from his head"; and A17* "child sitting with arms hanging down" of A17 "child sitting with hand to mouth".

B. Woman and her occupations 

7 signs in Gardiner (1957:448).

C. Anthropomorphic deities 

11 signs in Gardiner (1957:448f.) with the addition of five 19th Dynasty signs, C12 Amun, C17 Mont, C18 Tjanen, C19 and C20 Ptah.

D. Parts of the human body 

Expected quantity: 63

E. Mammals 

Expected quantity: 34

F. Parts of mammals 

Expected quantity: 52

G. Birds 

Expected quantity: 54

H. Parts of birds 

Expected quantity: 8

I. Amphibious animals, reptiles, etc. 

15 signs in Gardiner (1957:475f).

K. Fish and parts of fish 

Expected quantity: 7

L. Invertebrates and lesser animals 

Expected quantity: 7

M. Trees and plants 

44 signs in Gardiner (1957:478–484).

N. Sky, earth, water 

42 signs in Gardiner (1957:485–492).
N3 is an Old Kingdom variant of N2.
N11 "moon" has vertical (increscent and decrescent) variants, N12 is a 19th-Dynasty variant of N11.

O. Buildings, parts of buildings, etc. 

51 signs (with variants, U+13250–1329A).

P. Ships and parts of ships 

Expected quantity: 11

Q. Domestics and funerary furniture 

Expected quantity: 7

R. Temple furniture and sacred emblems 

Expected quantity: 25

S. Crowns, dress, staves, etc. 

Expected quantity: 45

T. Warfare, hunting, and butchery 

Expected quantity: 35

U. Agriculture, crafts, and professions 

41 signs.

V. Rope, fiber, baskets, bags, etc. 

40 signs (38 in Gardiner 1957). 
V39 is the Tyet or "Knot of Isis".
V40 is the numeral 10 in dates.

W. Vessels of stone and earthenware 

25 signs.

X. Loaves and cakes 

8 signs.

Y. Writings, games, music 

8 signs.

Z. Strokes, signs derived from Hieratic, geometrical figures 

11 signs.

Aa. Unclassified 

31 signs in Gardiner (1957).

Unicode

These hieroglyphs have unicode code points and so, given a suitable font, can be displayed or printed. The block starts at U+013000 for A001.

See also

Egyptian hieroglyphs
List of Egyptian hieroglyphs
Transliteration of Ancient Egyptian
List of cuneiform signs

References

Bibliography 

Budge, Sir E.A.Wallis,  An Egyptian Hieroglyphic Dictionary, in Two Volumes, Sir E.A.Wallis Budge, (Dover Publications, Inc. New York), c 1920, Dover Edition, c 1978.  (Large categorized listings of Hieroglyphs, Vol 1, pp. xcvii–cxlvii (97–147) (25 categories, 1000+ hieroglyphs), 50 pgs.)
A.H. Gardiner, Catalogue of the Egyptian hieroglyphic printing type, from matrices owned and controlled by Dr. Alan  (1928).
A.H. Gardiner, "Additions to the new hieroglyphic fount (1928)", The Journal of Egyptian Archaeology 15 (1929), p. 95.
A.H. Gardiner, "Additions to the new hieroglyphic fount (1931)", The Journal of Egyptian Archaeology 17 (1931), pp. 245–247.
A.H. Gardiner, Supplement to the catalogue of the Egyptian hieroglyphic printing type, showing acquisitions to December 1953  (1953).
A.H. Gardiner, Egyptian Grammar: Being an Introduction to the Study of Hieroglyphs. 3rd Ed., pub. Griffith Institute, Oxford, 1957 (1st edition 1927), pp. 438–548 (pdf).
Wilkinson, Richard,  Reading Egyptian Art, A Hieroglyphic Guide to Ancient Egyptian Painting and Sculpture, Richard H. Wilkinson, with 450 Illustrations, (Thames & Hudson Ltd, London), c 1992.

Reading list
: A primer based on Gardiner's sign list, focussing on major signs in seven categories.

External links
Hieroglyphic fonts 
Khemet.de on Gardiner 

 

Transliteration
Linguistics lists
Ancient Egypt-related lists